Justin Jordaan (born 9 January 1992) is a South African former cricketer. He made his first-class debut for South Western Districts in the 2009–10 CSA Provincial Three-Day Challenge on 28 January 2010.

References

External links
 

1992 births
Living people
South African cricketers
South Western Districts cricketers
People from Oudtshoorn
Cricketers from the Western Cape